Jonjo Dickman (born 22 September 1981) is an English former professional footballer who played as a midfielder. Dickman’s brothers, Elliot and Lewis, are coaches at  Sunderland . They also originated from the academy.

Career
Dickman was born in Hexham, Northumberland. He started his career at Sunderland, signing a professional contract in November 1998 after progressing through the club's youth system. He made one first-team appearance, as a half-time substitute in a 3–0 away defeat to Manchester City on 21 April 2003.

References

External links

1981 births
Living people
Sportspeople from Hexham
Footballers from Northumberland
English footballers
Association football midfielders
Sunderland A.F.C. players
York City F.C. players
Darlington F.C. players
Premier League players
English Football League players